Ring Round the Moon is a 1950 adaptation by the English dramatist Christopher Fry of Jean Anouilh's Invitation to the Castle (1947). Peter Brook commissioned Fry to adapt the play and the first production of Ring Round the Moon was given at the Globe Theatre. The production starred Paul Scofield, Claire Bloom and Margaret Rutherford.

Notable productions
 A West End production of Ring Round the Moon was given at the Theatre Royal Haymarket starring John Standing as the twins and Angela Thorne as Diana in 1967.
 A production was given in 1975 at the Center Theatre Group in Los Angeles, directed by Joseph Hardy and starring:
 Glynis Johns - Madam Desmermortes
 Michael York - Hugo/Frédéric
 Kitty Winn - Isabelle
 Steven Pimlott directed a production at the Royal Exchange, Manchester in 1983.
 The play was revived on Broadway in 1999 and starred Toby Stephens.
 The most recent West End production opened on 19 February 2008 at the Playhouse Theatre. The production, presented by Karl Sydow, and Act Productions, was directed by Sean Mathias with design by Colin Richmond and starred:
 Emily Bruni - Lady Dorothy India
 Fiona Button / Lindsay Armaou - Isabelle
 Joanna David - Geraldine Capulet
 Elisabeth Dermot-Walsh - Diana Messerschmann
 Peter Eyre - Joshua
 JJ Feild - Hugo/Frédéric
 Andrew Havill - Patrice Bombelles
 Belinda Lang - Mother (Josephine)
 Leigh Lawson - Romuald Messerschmann
 John Ramm - Guy-Charles Romainville
 Angela Thorne - Madame Desmersmortes
Music was composed by Jason Carr, and Wayne McGregor was movement director. Lighting was designed by Mark Henderson, and sound was designed by Gregory Clarke.

1962 plays
Plays by Christopher Fry